Brigadier General David K. MacEwen, USA was the 59th Adjutant General of the Army and Executive Director, Military Postal Service Agency located at the Human Resources Command, Fort Knox KY.

Education 

David K. “Mac” MacEwen is a native of Girard, Pennsylvania.  He attended Clarion University of Pennsylvania, graduating in 1981 as a Distinguished Military Graduate of the Army ROTC program.  He holds a Bachelor of Science degree in Business from Clarion and a master's degree in National Security and Strategic Studies from the U.S. Naval War College. His military education includes the Adjutant General Basic and Advanced Courses, Combined Arms and Services Staff School, the U.S. Army Command and General Staff College, and the U.S. Naval War College.

Military career 

His significant assignments include: Commanding General, Soldier Support Institute; Executive Officer to the Vice Chief of Staff, Army; Chief, Colonels Management Office; Commander, 1st Personnel Command; Chief of Staff, U.S. Army Human Resources Command; J1, CJTF-7; G1 and G5, V Corps and the G1 of both the 2d Infantry Division and the 1st Armored Division.

Deployments 

Operation Desert Shield and Desert Storm
Intrinsic Action
Task Force Hawk
Operation Allied Force and JTF Shining Hope
Operation Allied Harbor
Operation Iraqi Freedom

Decorations and honors 

 Distinguished Service Medal with one Oak Leaf Cluster
   Legion of Merit with three Oak Leaf Clusters
   Bronze Star with one Oak Leaf Cluster
 Defense Meritorious Service Medal with two Oak Leaf Clusters
   Meritorious Service Medal with six Oak Leaf Clusters
 Joint Service Commendation Medal
   Army Commendation Medal with two Oak Leaf Clusters
   Army Achievement Medal
 Department of the Army Staff Identification Badge
 Combat Action Badge

References

 Biography at U.S. House of Representatives

External links

Living people
Clarion University of Pennsylvania alumni
Naval War College alumni
United States Army generals
Recipients of the Legion of Merit
Year of birth missing (living people)